The Gère is a  tributary of the Rhône in the Isère department of Auvergne-Rhône-Alpes (France). Its source is in a pond of the Grand Tuilière in the eastern part of the Bonnevaux forest.  It flows into the Rhone at Vienne.  Its power was put to work for paper mills, foundries, and textile mills in the Gère Valley at the beginning of the industrial era.

Gallery

References

External links
 
 

Rivers of France

Rivers of Isère
Rivers of Auvergne-Rhône-Alpes